The Myth of the First Three Years: A New Understanding of Early Brain Development and Lifelong Learning (1999) is a book written by John Bruer.
The book explains the exaggerations of basic critical period neuroscience research "resulting in a potentially disproportionate channeling of resources toward early childhood education."

First Three Years
The book discusses the myths surrounding early childhood development, in particular, the myth that "the first three years of a baby's life determine whether or not the child will grow into a successful, thinking person."
According to a review: "Parents have been sold a bill of goods that is highly destructive because it overemphasizes infant and toddler nurturing to the detriment of long-term parental and educational responsibilities."

See also
Critical Period Hypothesis

Notes

References

1999 non-fiction books
Child development